Social Psychiatry and Psychiatric Epidemiology is a monthly peer-reviewed medical journal covering the epidemiology of psychiatric disorders. It was established in 1966 under the name Social Psychiatry, obtaining its current name in 1988. It is published by Springer Science+Business Media. The editor-in-chief is Craig Morgan (King's College London). According to the Journal Citation Reports, the journal has a 2021 impact factor of 4.519.

References

External links

Epidemiology journals
Psychiatry journals
Publications established in 1966
Springer Science+Business Media academic journals
Monthly journals
English-language journals